Hoima Regional Referral Hospital, commonly known as Hoima Hospital, is a hospital in the city of Hoima in Hoima District in  the Western Region of Uganda. It is the referral hospital for the districts of Bulisa,  Hoima, Kibaale,  Kiryandongo, Kagadi, Kakumiro, Kikuube, and Masindi.

Location
The coordinates of Hoima Regional Referral Hospital are 01°25'41.0"N, 31°21'16.0"E (Latitude:1.428051; Longitude:31.354451).

Overview
Hoima Hospital is a public hospital, funded by the Uganda Ministry of Health, and general care in the hospital is free. It is one of the thirteen Regional Referral Hospitals in Uganda. The hospital is one of the fifteen internship hospitals in Uganda where graduates of Ugandan medical schools can serve one year of internship under the supervision of qualified specialists and consultants. The bed capacity of Hoima Hospital was reported to be 280 in 2013. Of the 337 gazetted staff positions, only 251 were filled as of March 2011, leaving 85 vacant positions.

Established in 1935, the facility initially functioned as a district hospital. In 1994, it was upgraded to Regional Referral status for the Bunyoro sub-region. It also serves patients from nearby Eastern Democratic Republic of the Congo. In 2019, the Ugandan Ministry of Health estimated the hospital's catchment population to number approximately 3 million people.

See also
List of hospitals in Uganda

References

External links
 Website of Uganda Ministry of Health

Hospitals in Uganda
Hoima
Hoima District
Bunyoro sub-region
Western Region, Uganda
Hospitals established in 1935
1935 establishments in Uganda